The England women's national under-20 football team is a now defunct association football team that represented England women at under-20 level until 2018. It was governed by the Football Association (FA) since 1993, having been previously administered by the Women's Football Association (WFA). Although most national football teams represent a sovereign state, as a member of the United Kingdom's Home Nations, England is permitted by FIFA statutes to maintain its own national side that competes in all major tournaments. The team now operates as England Under-21s.

2018 Under-20 World Cup 
In 2018 they finished third at the 2018 FIFA U-20 Women's World Cup, their best ever finish at the tournament. They won the play-off for third 4–2 on penalties against the host nation France. In the knockout rounds, they overcame tournament debutants the Netherlands 2–1 in the quarter-finals before losing 2–0 to Japan, which was the first time England they had reached the semi-final stage.

Move to U-21 system 
In a bid to better aid the transition between the youth pathway and senior football, the WFA announced in September 2018 that they were scrapping the U23s and U20s format in order to form an Under-21s age group, which would become the top tier of the nation's professional development phase. The move would align England's structure to that used in other European countries, allowing for more age-appropriate games and better manage individual player development post-U20 World Cup for those who have genuine senior team potential. The then U20s manager Mo Marley was announced as head coach.

Competitive record

FIFA Under-20 Women's World Cup

Current squad

Head coach Mo Marley named a 21-player squad to participate in the 2018 FIFA U-20 Women's World Cup in Brittany, France.

Players born between 1 January 1998 and 31 December 2002 were eligible to compete in the tournament.

References

under-20
European women's national under-20 association football teams